Savo Milošević (born 2 September 1973) is a Serbian professional football manager and former player.

A former forward, he signed for English club Aston Villa after making a name for himself at Partizan. He would go on to spend the vast majority of his career in Spain, where he amassed La Liga totals of 91 goals in 241 games for Zaragoza, Espanyol, Celta and Osasuna. Over the course of his 16-year professional career, Milošević played for eight clubs and scored over 220 goals in nearly 600 official appearances.

At the international level, Milošević played for the national team of FR Yugoslavia (later renamed Serbia and Montenegro) and Serbia, winning over 100 caps for both teams combined. Milošević appeared in two World Cups and one European Championship, at which he earned the Golden Boot at Euro 2000.

Club career

Partizan
Milošević started playing football at the age of six and spent his youth in the Drina Valley, until at 14 he was spotted by FK Partizan scouts, who convinced the club to secure his transfer for 5,000 Deutsche Mark.

In 1992, Milošević made his senior debut for Partizan, scoring 14 goals in 31 games during his first season at the club. Milošević went on to score an impressive 21 and 30 league goals in his next two seasons respectively – competition-bests in both years – as the Belgrade club won back-to-back national championships, including the double in 1993–94.

Aston Villa
In the summer of 1995, then Aston Villa manager Brian Little bought Milošević from Partizan for £3.5 million, a club record at the time. His spell in England lasted three seasons, during which time he earned the tabloid nickname "Miss-a-lot-ević" owing to his frequent goalscoring dry spells.

However, Milošević did score 33 goals in 117 games for Villa (29 in the Premier League), including one in the 1995–96 Football League Cup final, a 3–0 win against Leeds United.

Zaragoza
Milošević signed for La Liga club Real Zaragoza in 1998 for 8.5 million pounds, again recording some impressive goalscoring performances, notably netting 21 in the 1999–2000 season as the team secured fourth position.

Parma
After rediscovering his form in Spain, Milošević joined Parma A.C. in the summer of 2000 for €25 million. He was a regular starter in his first season in Italy, playing in 21 out of 34 Serie A matches and scoring 8 goals; in the next season, however, he was sparingly used.

Milošević was loaned back to Spain in January 2002, re-joining his former club Zaragoza to replace Blackburn Rovers-bound Yordi. He scored six times during his second spell, finishing as the club's joint top scorer – alongside Yordi and Roberto Acuña. His second spell at Zaragoza ended unsuccessfully, with the club eventually relegated.

In the 2002–03 campaign, Milošević played for RCD Espanyol, again finishing as his team's top scorer but narrowly escaping relegation, a fate that would befall him the following year with Celta de Vigo. Milošević was able to help Celta reach the round-of-16 in their first ever appearance in the UEFA Champions League, with his one goal in seven appearances in the competition coming in a 3–2 group stage home win against AFC Ajax.

Later years

In mid-July 2004, aged 30, Milošević signed a three-year contract with another Spanish top flight club, CA Osasuna. In his second season with the Navarrese, he scored 11 goals in 32 games to help the team qualify for the Champions League. Though Milošević failed to score in ten appearances in the subsequent UEFA Cup semifinal run, he did provide two assists in a 3–0 away win against Bayer 04 Leverkusen in the first leg of the quarterfinal (which Osasuna won 4–0 on aggregate).

In the summer of 2007, Milošević's contract expired and he left Osasuna after 3 seasons at the club. He took a six-month break from competitive football, during which time he had a trial with Major League Soccer's Toronto FC with a view of signing with them for the 2008 season. The deal fell through and, on 8 March 2008, he agreed terms with FC Rubin Kazan prior to the start of the Russian Premier League campaign.

On 2 November 2008, Milošević scored the decisive goal for Rubin in a game against FC Saturn Ramenskoye, securing the team their first ever national championship. He retired shortly afterwards, aged 35.

International career
He played on 1992 Toulon Tournament and reached the finals with the team.
Milošević earned 102 caps for Serbia, making his international debut for the nation (then named Federal Republic of Yugoslavia) on 23 December 1994, in a 2–0 friendly loss in Brazil. Milošević scored 37 goals for his country over the course of a 14-year international career.

After appearing in two games at the 1998 FIFA World Cup, Milošević scored five goals at UEFA Euro 2000, earning him the Golden Boot, an award he shared with Dutch forward Patrick Kluivert.

Milošević made his 100th international appearance on 16 June 2006 during the FIFA World Cup in Germany, in a 6–0 group stage loss against Argentina, and in doing so became the most capped player in Serbian history. As a formal farewell from international football, he was called up for a friendly with Bulgaria on 19 November 2008, scoring twice and missing two penalties in a 6–1 win before being replaced by Dragan Mrđa.

Managerial career

Montenegro (assistant)
From 2011 to 2012, Milošević was an assistant manager to Branko Brnović at the Montenegro national team.

Partizan
On 27 March 2019, Milošević was named by the board of directors at Partizan as the club's new manager, with his first win as Partizan's manager came on 3 April 2019, in a 3–2 home win against Čukarički.

In Milošević's first Eternal derby as manager of Partizan, his team suffered a 2–1 away loss to Red Star Belgrade, with Ricardo Gomes's 90th-minute strike proving only a consolation.

At the end of his first season in charge, Milošević succeeded in qualifying Partizan for the 2019–20 UEFA Europa League qualifying rounds, and on 23 May 2019, won his first managerial trophy as his Partizan side beat Red Star Belgrade 1–0 in the 2018–19 Serbian Cup Final, courtesy of a Bojan Ostojić goal.

In July and August 2019, Partizan secured their ninth participation in the group stages of UEFA Europa League. Under Milošević's leadership, Partizan knocked-out Connah's Quay Nomads (4–0 on aggregate), Yeni Malatyaspor (3–2 on aggregate) and Molde (3–2 on aggregate) in the qualifiers. On 30 August, Partizan was drawn in to Group L of the 2019–20 UEFA Europa League, alongside Manchester United, Astana and AZ Alkmaar.

Olimpija Ljubljana
On 16 June 2021, Milošević was named new manager of Slovenian PrvaLiga side Olimpija Ljubljana. He left the club less than four months later, on 10 October 2021.

Personal life

Milošević was born into an ethnic Serb family in the Semberija city of Bijeljina and was raised in Johovac, both in the then-SR Bosnia and Herzegovina, SFR Yugoslavia, where he lived with a younger brother Andrija (1975–2013) and younger sister Cvijeta "Mira". Milošević's mother died in 2000 from cancer; he has paternal ancestry from the large Milošević brotherhood of the Vasojevići tribe in northeastern Montenegro, and was a relative of Slobodan Milošević.

Milošević was a political supporter of the Democratic Party led by Boris Tadić, having supported it since 1993 after meeting with Zoran Đinđić and officially becoming a member in 2003. He took part in the 1996–97 protests and the 5 October Overthrow.

Milošević is married to Vesna, with whom he had two sons, including Nikola, and a daughter. On 11 June 2011, his father Stevan "Stevo" (1953–2011) was shot in the chest and killed in the family house in Glavičice by his grandfather Savo (1928–2012), after a family row; the latter was later detained.

Career statistics

Club

International

Scores and results list FR Yugoslavia, Serbia and Montenegro and Serbia's goal tally first, score column indicates score after each Milošević goal.

Managerial statistics

Honours

Player
Partizan 
First League of Serbia and Montenegro: 1992–93, 1993–94
Yugoslav Cup: 1993–94

Aston Villa 
Football League Cup: 1995–96

Rubin Kazan 
Russian Premier League: 2008

Individual
First League of FR Yugoslavia: top scorer 1993–94, 1994–95
UEFA Euro 2000: Golden Boot, Team of the Tournament

Manager
Partizan
Serbian Cup: 2018–19

See also
 List of men's footballers with 100 or more international caps

References

External links

 Savo Milošević at Serbian National Team page
 
 
 
 

1973 births
Living people
People from Bijeljina
Serbs of Bosnia and Herzegovina
Serbian people of Montenegrin descent
Yugoslav footballers
Serbian footballers
Association football forwards
FK Partizan players
Premier League players
Aston Villa F.C. players
La Liga players
Real Zaragoza players
RCD Espanyol footballers
RC Celta de Vigo players
CA Osasuna players
Serie A players
Parma Calcio 1913 players
Russian Premier League players
FC Rubin Kazan players
Yugoslavia international footballers
Serbia and Montenegro international footballers
Serbia international footballers
1998 FIFA World Cup players
2006 FIFA World Cup players
UEFA Euro 2000 players
Serbian expatriate footballers
Expatriate footballers in England
Expatriate footballers in Spain
Expatriate footballers in Italy
Expatriate footballers in Russia
Serbia and Montenegro expatriate footballers
Serbia and Montenegro footballers
Serbia and Montenegro expatriate sportspeople in Spain
Serbia and Montenegro expatriate sportspeople in Italy
Serbian expatriate sportspeople in Spain
Serbian expatriate sportspeople in Russia
FIFA Century Club
Serbian sports executives and administrators
Serbian expatriate sportspeople in England
Serbian football managers
FK Partizan managers
Serbian SuperLiga managers
NK Olimpija Ljubljana (2005) managers
Serbian expatriate football managers
Expatriate football managers in Slovenia
Serbian expatriate sportspeople in Slovenia